Contemplation is the first solo EP by jazz pianist Mike Garson and was released in 2006 at his Myspace site.

Track listing
Contemplation I
Contemplation II
Contemplation III
Contemplation IV

References

External links
 Regenmag Review   EP track listing and review
 Official site

Mike Garson albums
2006 EPs